Hoda Ablan (born 1971) is a Yemeni poet. She was born in Ibb and studied at the University of Sanaa, obtaining a master's degree in political science in 1993. Her first collection of poetry Wurud shaqiyat al-malamih (Roses with Mischievous Features) was published in Damascus in 1989. She has since published several other poetry collections. Her work has appeared in translation in several outlets including two issues of Banipal magazine (issues 8 and 36). Her poetry was also anthologised in a 2001 collection titled The poetry of Arab women : a contemporary anthology, edited by Nathalie Handal.

Ablan has served as the secretary-general of the Yemeni Writers Union. She is married with children.

References

1971 births
Yemeni women poets
People from Ibb Governorate
Living people
Sanaa University alumni
20th-century poets
20th-century Yemeni women writers 
21st-century poets
21st-century Yemeni women writers